Cyperus setiger is a species of sedge that is native to central and southern parts of the United States.

See also 
 List of Cyperus species

References 

setiger
Plants described in 1836
Flora of Texas
Flora of Oklahoma
Flora of Kansas
Flora of Missouri
Flora of New Mexico
Taxa named by John Torrey
Taxa named by William Jackson Hooker
Flora without expected TNC conservation status